Carl Sören Harry Cratz (born 28 September 1948) is a Swedish former football manager. As a manager of Hammarby IF, he won the 2001 Allsvenskan.

References

Swedish football managers
Degerfors IF managers
IFK Norrköping managers
Trelleborgs FF managers
Vaasan Palloseura managers
Hammarby Fotboll managers
Helsingborgs IF managers
Mjällby AIF managers
1948 births
Living people